Scott Tixier (born February 26, 1986) is a French jazz violinist and professor of jazz violin at the University of North Texas.

Life and career

Tixier was born in Montreuil, France, and studied classical violin at the conservatory in Paris. Following that, he studied improvisation as a self-educated jazz musician and under Florin Niculescu then Malo Vallois.

Tixier has worked in theater, film scoring, Broadway shows, for Sony Pictures, ARTE Creative, Heineken, Dos Equis, Fisher-Price, America's Got Talent on NBC, with Zedd on the David Letterman Late Show on CBS, for Josh Groban, Harvey Keitel, Robert De Niro, Sting, Jean Reno, Whoopi Goldberg, Marc Jacobs, Keith David, Pierre Palmade, Pierre Richard, David Ackroyd, NBA player Allan Houston, Christina Aguilera, Chrisette Michele, Doug E. Fresh, JR, Ariana Grande, and Monica Dogra.

He has performed and recorded with Stevie Wonder, Elton John, Roger Waters, Kenny Barron, John Legend, Chris Potter, Christina Aguilera, Common, Anthony Braxton, Joss Stone, Gladys Knight, Natalie Cole, Wayne Brady, Chris Walden, Greg Phillinganes, Ray Chew, The Isley Brothers, Cory Smythe, Maceo Parker, Janet Cardiff, Siegfried Kessler, Tony Middleton, Lonnie Plaxico, Myron Walden, Clifford Adams (Kool & the Gang), Helen Sung, Brice Wassy, Gerald Cleaver, Lew Soloff, Yvonnick Prene, Tigran Hamasyan, James Weidman, Marcus McLauren, Giada Valenti, and Tommy Sims.

He played at Carnegie Hall, the Radio City Music Hall, Madison Square Garden, Barclays Center, the Golden Globes, Jazz at Lincoln Center, the Blue Note Jazz Club, the Apollo Theater, the Smalls Jazz Club, The Stone, Roulette, Smoke Jazz, Hammerstein Ballroom, Joe's Pub, Williamsburg Music Center, Prudential Center and the United States Capitol.

On August 15, 2016, two of the songs "Dig It" and "100,000 Hours" from the album Cosmic Adventure were featured on NPR for the show Morning Edition hosted by David Greene, during This Week in Politics.Morning Edition is among the highest rated public radio shows.

On October 22, 2016 Tixier was performing with Kevin Spacey, Cassandra Wilson, Patti Austin, Andra Day, David Alan Grier and Lizz Wright alongside the Count Basie Orchestra at the Apollo Theater to celebrate the 100th Anniversary of Ella Fitzgerald.

Cosmic Adventure was selected as "Best Albums Of 2016" by Downbeat Magazine

In 2021, Tixier was featured on Jermaine Stegall's score for the sequel of Coming 2 America starring Eddie Murphy. During an interview for NBC, he describes some of the challenges he faced working on the movie in the middle of the COVID-19 pandemic.

Awards and honors

 Trophées du Sunside, 2007
 Top 50 album, Brooklyn Bazaar, Jazztimes Critics' Poll 2012
 Rising Star (violin), DownBeat Critics' Poll, 2018
 Grammy award for participation in the PJ Morton album, Gumbo Unplugged, 2018
 Grammy award for participation in John Legend A Legendary Christmas Album, 2019
 2 Grammy awards for participation in the Lion King soundtrack, Lion King score by Hans Zimmer, 2019
 Grammy award for participation in John Legend album, Bigger Love, 2020

Discography

As leader
 Brooklyn Bazaar (Sunnyside, 2011)
 Cosmic Adventure  (Sunnyside, 2016)

As sideman
 The Candy Shop Boys, John Wick (Original Motion Picture Soundtrack) (Varese Sarabande, 2014)
 Keyon Harrold, The Mugician (Sony, 2017)
 Jana Herzen, Nothing but Love (Motema, 2020)
 John Legend, A Legendary Christmas (Columbia Records, 2018)
 Charnett Moffett, Bright New Day (Motema, 2019)
 Hans Zimmer, The Lion King [2019 Original Motion Picture Soundtrack] (Disney, 2019)
 Brian Tyler, Charlie's Angels (Original Motion Picture Score) (Sony Classical, 2019)
 Tony Tixier, I am Human (Whirlwind Records, 2020)
 Count Basie Orchestra, Ella 100: Live at the Apollo! (Concord, 2020)
 Ben l'Oncle Soul, Addicted to You (Blue Note, 2020)
 John Legend, Bigger Love (Columbia Records, 2020)
 Terence Blanchard, Da 5 Bloods (Original Motion Picture Score) (Sony Music, 2020)

References

External links
 Official site

1986 births
Living people
People from Montreuil, Seine-Saint-Denis
21st-century French male violinists
Avant-garde jazz violinists
Chamber jazz musicians
French jazz violinists
French male jazz musicians
Sunnyside Records artists